The following highways are numbered 745:

Canada
 Alberta Highway 745 (former)
 New Brunswick Route 745
Saskatchewan Highway 745

Costa Rica
 National Route 745

United States